Gœgnies-Chaussée (also spelled Goegnies-Chaussée) is a village of Wallonia and a district of the municipality of Quévy, located in the province of Hainaut, Belgium.

The border between Belgium and France runs right through the village, separating the Belgian Gœgnies-Chaussée from the French Gognies-Chaussée.

External links

Belgium–France border crossings
Former municipalities of Hainaut (province)